Fritz Bache (29 March 1898 – 6 December 1959) was a German footballer.

References

1898 births
1959 deaths
Association football defenders
German footballers
Germany international footballers
Hertha BSC players
Wacker 04 Berlin players